The 2022 Clemson Tigers football team represented Clemson University during the 2022 NCAA Division I FBS football season. The Tigers were led by head coach Dabo Swinney, in his 15th year. The Tigers competed as a member of the Atlantic Coast Conference (ACC) and played their home games at Memorial Stadium in Clemson, South Carolina.

Offseason

Recruiting

Clemson's 2022 class consisted of 20 signees.  The class was ranked first in the ACC and tenth best overall by the 247Sports Composite.

Players leaving for NFL

NFL draftees

Undrafted free agents

Transfers

Players leaving

Incoming transfers

Post-season Transfers 

The following players entered the transfer portal during the designated 45 day window after championship selections are made.

Preseason

Award watchlists
Listed in the order that they were released

Schedule

Rankings

Personnel

Coaching staff

Roster

Game summaries

vs. Georgia Tech

Furman

Louisiana Tech

at No. 21 Wake Forest

No. 10 NC State

at Boston College

at Florida State

No. 14 Syracuse

at Notre Dame

Louisville

Miami (FL)

South Carolina

vs. No. 23 North Carolina

vs. No. 6 Tennessee

Awards and honors

References

Clemson
Clemson Tigers football seasons
Atlantic Coast Conference football champion seasons
Clemson Tigers football